The 2014 season is Brann's 28th season in the Tippeligaen since their promotion in 1987, and their first season with Rikard Norling as manager. Brann will compete in the Tippeligaen and the Norwegian Cup.

Squad

On Loan

Transfers

Winter

In:

Out:

Summer

In:

Out:

Competitions

Tippeligaen

Results summary

Results by round

Results

Table

Relegation play-offs

Norwegian Cup

Squad statistics

Appearances and goals

|-
|colspan="14"|Players away from the club on loan:

|-
|colspan="14"|Players who played for Brann that left during the season:
|}

Goal scorers

Disciplinary record

References

External links 
 http://www.brann.no SK Brann official club pages

Norwegian football clubs 2014 season
2014